Nassau College may refer to:

 Nassau Community College - A 2-year college in East Garden City, Long Island, New York.
 Nassau College – Hofstra Memorial of New York University at Hempstead, Long Island - The former name of Hofstra University/NYU extension.
 Nassau Hall -  The oldest building on Princeton University's campus.
 Queen's College, Nassau - The oldest private school in the Bahamas
 Christelijk College Nassau-Veluwe - A school in Harderwijk, The Netherlands